Syr River may refer to:
 Syre (river), Luxembourg
 Syr Darya, Kyrgyzstan, Uzbekistan